Octolasion is a genus of annelids belonging to the family Lumbricidae.

The species of this genus are found in Europe and Northern America.

Species:
 Octolasion alpinum Örley, 1885 
 Octolasion frivaldszkyi Örley, 1885

References

Lumbricidae
Annelid genera